Lennie Kristensen (born 16 May 1968) is a Danish former professional cyclist. He competed in the men's cross-country mountain biking event at the 1996 Summer Olympics.

Major results

Road

1991
 10th Overall Tour of Sweden
1999
 1st Stage 1a (ITT) Tour de Langkawi
2000
 1st Stage 4 Tour de Normandie
 5th Overall Danmark Rundt
 6th Overall Tour de Langkawi
 8th Overall Tour de Luxembourg
2002
 2nd Time trial, National Road Championships
 2nd Grand Prix de Wallonie
 2nd Rund um die Hainleite
 4th Overall Tour of Austria
 4th Paris–Camembert
 8th Rund um Düren
 10th Overall Tour de Luxembourg
 10th Classique des Alpes
2003
 2nd Overall Tour Down Under

Mountain

1992
 1st  Cross-country, National Mountain Bike Championships
1994
 3rd Cross-country, National Mountain Bike Championships
1996
 3rd Cross-country, National Mountain Bike Championships
1997
 1st  Cross-country, European Mountain Bike Championships
 2nd Cross-country, National Mountain Bike Championships
1999
 3rd Cross-country, National Mountain Bike Championships

References

External links
 

1968 births
Living people
Danish male cyclists
Olympic cyclists of Denmark
Cyclists at the 1996 Summer Olympics
People from Silkeborg
Sportspeople from the Central Denmark Region